Colby Aaron Bockwoldt (born April 14, 1981) is a former American football linebacker. He was drafted by the New Orleans Saints in the seventh round of the 2004 NFL Draft. He played college football at Brigham Young.

Bockwoldt has also been a member of the Tennessee Titans, San Francisco 49ers and Cleveland Browns.

Early years
Colby played linebacker and tight end during the 1996–1998 football seasons at Northridge High School in Layton, Utah. He was a two-year starter and earned All-State honors in both years. In 1998 Colby was selected as the States Defensive MVP.  He still holds many defensive records at Northrige High School. Colby's Jersey, #46, was retired in early 2007.

College career
Attended BYU from 1999–2004. Colby started for 2 seasons and was a special teams contributor throughout his career. He received numerous awards including USA Today HM All-American, All-Conference, Academic All-Conference, and many team awards.

Professional career

New Orleans Saints
He started his career with the New Orleans Saints where he played 2004, starting half of the season, and 2005, leading the team in tackles with over 100.

Tennessee Titans
In 2006, he signed a one-year deal with the Tennessee Titans.

San Francisco 49ers
On March 19, 2007, he signed a one-year deal with the San Francisco 49ers. On September 1, 2007 the 49ers cut him.

Cleveland Browns
He signed with the Cleveland Browns on December 5, 2007 when linebacker Kris Griffin was placed on injured reserve. On December 12, 2007, he was released from the Browns.

Florida Tuskers
Bockwoldt was signed by the Florida Tuskers of the United Football League on August 25, 2009.

References

External links
BYU Cougars bio
United Football League bio

1981 births
Living people
Sportspeople from Ogden, Utah
Players of American football from Utah
American football linebackers
BYU Cougars football players
New Orleans Saints players
Tennessee Titans players
San Francisco 49ers players
Cleveland Browns players
Florida Tuskers players